Man the Lifeboat is a board game published in 1987 by San Serif.

Contents
Man the Lifeboat is a game in which each player controls one lifeboat for inshore rescues and another lifeboat for offshore rescues.

Reception
David Pritchard reviewed Man the Lifeboat for Games International magazine, and gave it 2 stars out of 5, and stated that "Main the Lifeboat is fast-moving and undemanding, but one feels that it could have been developed into a better game."

References

Board games introduced in 1987